Opegrapha is a genus of lichenized fungi in the family Opegraphaceae. Species include:

References 

Arthoniomycetes
Lichen genera
Taxa named by Erik Acharius
Arthoniomycetes genera